Mesodytes is an extinct genus of predaceous diving beetles in the family Dytiscidae. There is one described species in Mesodytes, M. rhantoides.

References

Dytiscidae